Sticta lumbschiana is a species of foliose lichen in the family Peltigeraceae. It is found in the Colombian Andes.

Taxonomy

The lichen was formally described as a new species in by lichenologists Bibiana Moncada and Robert Lücking. The species epithet honours lichenologist colleague Thorsten Lumbsch, "for his invaluable contributions to lichenology and his support of this project on the genus Sticta".

In a time-calibrated chronogram of the phylogeny of the genus Sticta, Sticta lumbschiana was most closely related to S. pseudodilatata and a clade containing S. papillata, S. dilata, and S. macrocyphyllata.

Habitat and distribution

Its distribution is limited to the Cordillera Central and eastern slopes of the Cordillera Oriental regions. The species can be found growing on bark, fallen trunks, and sometimes even on soil. It is commonly associated with liverworts of the genera Metzgeria, Bazzania, Plagiochila, and Radula.

References

lumbschiana
Lichen species
Lichens described in 2013
Lichens of Colombia
Taxa named by Robert Lücking